Salvador Coreas may refer to:

 Francisco Jovel (footballer, born 1951), Salvadoran football defender and football manager
 Francisco Jovel (footballer, born 1982), Salvadoran football defender, and son of the footballer born 1951